"Late" was an obscure single released in very limited numbers by the band Blue Angel, taken from their 1980 album also called Blue Angel. Lee Brovitz was the primary songwriter, sharing co-writing credits with Lauper and Turi.

7" vinyl track listing (Spain) 
Length: 5 min 35 sec

Personnel
 Music: Lee Brovitz, Cyndi Lauper and John Turi. Production: Roy Halee.
 Lyrics: Lee Brovitz, Cyndi Lauper and John Turi. Production: Roy Halee.

7" vinyl track listing (Australia) 
Length: 6 min 50 sec

Personnel
 Music: Lee Brovitz, Cyndi Lauper and John Turi. Production: Roy Halee.
 Lyrics: Lee Brovitz, Cyndi Lauper and John Turi. Production: Roy Halee.

External links 
 Official Lee Brovitz website
 Single's entry at official Discography
 Historical entry on official website
 Official Cyndi Lauper website

1980 singles
Cyndi Lauper songs
Blue Angel (band) songs
Songs written by Cyndi Lauper
Songs written by John Turi
Song recordings produced by Roy Halee
1980 songs
Polydor Records singles